Insect Song is the second studio album by American heavy metal band Beyond the Embrace. It was released in 2004 on Metal Blade Records.

Track listing

Personnel 
 Shawn Gallagher - vocals
 Alex Botelho - guitar
 Jeff Saude - guitar
 Oscar Gouveia - guitar
 Dan Jagoda - drums
 Chris Parlon - bass

2004 albums
Beyond the Embrace albums
Metal Blade Records albums
Albums with cover art by Travis Smith (artist)